Black Forest is a short drama film, directed by Philippe-David Gagné and Jean-Marc E. Roy and released in 2018. It is a co-production of companies from Canada and France.

Plot
The film centres on three Canadian women travelling in the Jura department of France, who are accused of murder and are ordered by the judge to participate in a forensic reconstruction of the crime.

Cast
The film's cast includes Charli Arcouette-Martineau, Bernard Belley, Jean-Carl Boucher, Érika Brisson, Paul-Henri Callens, Philippe Dillembourg, Nadia Essadiqi, Josée Gagnon, Luc Gauthier, Joanie Guérin, Fayolle Jean, Pascale Montpetit, Christian Ouellet, Guillaume Ouellet, Bruno Piccolo and Sasha Samar.

Production
Although set in France, the film was shot primarily in Saguenay, Quebec, most notably at the Père-Honorat mill in Laterrière.

Awards
The film received a Canadian Screen Award nomination for Best Live Action Short Drama at the 8th Canadian Screen Awards in 2020.

References

External links
 

2018 films
2018 short films
French drama short films
Quebec films
Films shot in Quebec
Films set in France
Saguenay, Quebec
French-language Canadian films
Films directed by Jean-Marc E. Roy
Films directed by Philippe David Gagné
Canadian drama short films
2010s Canadian films
2010s French films